The Caledonian Republicans (abbreviated LRC) is a liberal-conservative political party in New Caledonia. The party's founding congress was held on 7 December 2017 at Nouvata Hotel in the capital Nouméa, but its origins can be traced to a political group in Congress that split from The Rally on 18 July 2017.

History 
The Caledonian Republicans was formed in the days leading up to the 2017 French legislative election, after disagreements between candidates of The Republicans (represented by The Rally in New Caledonia). Members of the newly founded party criticized other anti-independence parties' economic and labour platforms and rallied under the leadership of trade unionist Sonia Backès.

References

External links 
 
 

Political parties in New Caledonia
Political parties established in 2017
Conservative parties in France
Gaullist parties